Sarail is an upazila of Brahmanbaria District located in the Chittagong Division and near the Dhaka Division, Bangladesh.

History

The leader of the Baro-Bhuiyan zamindars, Isa Khan, had his first and temporary capital situated in Sarail. During the Mughal era, Sarail was a mahallah (district) of the Sylhet Sarkar.

During the dewani of Dewan Shahbaz Khan in 1650, the Hatirpul was constructed. It was a bridge built over the canal mainly for elephant pass. The Mughal dewans used to communicate by the elephant in this road and also took rest near this bridge. In 1662, the Arifil Mosque was constructed by Shah Arif. There are unknown tombs located near the mosque, supposedly belonging to the wives of Isa Khan.

During the Bangladesh Liberation War of 1971, the Pakistani Army killed about 70 innocent people in the Bitghar area. On 5 May, the freedom fighters raided the Pakistani Army's camp in the Shahbazpur area and killed 9 Pakistani soldiers; one freedom fighter was killed during this raid. A number of Pakistani Army officers and the chairman of the Sarail Peace Committee were also killed. The freedom fighters set up a mine bomb north of Kalikaccha Bazar. This exploded and destroyed two military vehicles. Three mass graves remain in Sarail. Memorial monuments were established in the upazila's Bitghar area, the Annada Government High School, the Sarail Degree College and also a monument dedicated to the martyr Sheikh Mesbahuddin Saraili.

In 1990, Sarail was made an upazila of Bangladesh.

Geography
It has 43,854 households and a total area of 227.22 km2.

Demographics
According to the 1991 Bangladesh census, Sarail had a population of 254,481. Males constituted 50.32% of the population, and females 49.68%. The population aged 18 or over was 120,249. Sarail had an average literacy rate of 22.6% (7+ years), against the national average of 32.4%.

Administration
Sarail Upazila is divided into nine union parishads: Auraol, Chunta, Kalikachchha, Noagaon, Pakshimul, Panishor, Sarail, Shahbazpur, and Shahjadapur. The union parishads are subdivided into 67 mauzas and 141 villages.

Upazila Chairman: Rafique Uddin Thakur

Notable residents
Nurul Amin, Prime Minister Of Pakistan
Sheuly Azad, Member of Parliament, lives in West Kuttapara.
Abdus Sattar Bhuiyan
Ullaskar Dutta, Indian revolutionary
Isa Khan, first chief of the Baro-Bhuiyan confederacy which resisted the Mughal rule in Bengal
Ismail Khan, brother of Isa Khan
Masum Khan, zamindar and Mughal Army officer
Musa Khan, second chief of the Baro-Bhuiyans of Bengal
Habibur Rahman Milon, journalist
Ahmed Rafiq, writer and researcher
Rafique Uddin Thakur, Upazila Chairman, lives in KuttaPara.
Taheruddin Thakur, politician

See also
Upazilas of Bangladesh
Districts of Bangladesh
Divisions of Bangladesh

References

 
Upazilas of Brahmanbaria District